Camp Wekeela is a 60-acre sleep-away summer camp in Maine with an estimated 300 campers and 135 employees each summer. It is a traditional resident summer camp for boys and girls ages 7–16, in season from June to August.

2022 marks 100 years of camp at Little Bear Pond.

This property is situated on a mountain lake, Little Bear Pond in the town of Hartford, Maine. Camp Wekeela is twenty minutes north of Lewiston-Auburn in the Oxford County region of Maine. The facility is approximately seventy minutes from Portland Airport, three hours from Boston and six hours from the New York Metropolitan Area.

History
In 1922, Emma Graumann opened a camp for girls on the shores of Little Bear Pond called We-You-Wega. After World War II, Joe and Francis Weene took over Camp We-You-Wega and turned into a boys' camp now named Wekeela. They came up with the current name by blending their last name with the names of their sons Ken and Larry (We+kee+la).

During the Summer of 1968 Camp Wekeela served as a training site for a group of Peace Corps Volunteers going to Ethiopia.

In 1970, Claire and Dusty Drew purchased Camp Wekeela and turned it into a co-ed camp. During this time, the camp had approximately 75 - 100 campers. Most of the cabins had indoor plumbing but some cabins relied on outdoor showers. Cabin names during the 1970s included: Fireball, Brookside, Lakeside, Roadside and Strawberry Hill. An area designated "up top" was reserved for older campers. Dusty was known for his cigars (memorialized in a camp play as "Dusty Drew Exploding Cigars") and Claire was the camp nurse. Popular camp activities during the 1970s included Drama, Arts and Crafts and Archery. Free swim in the lake occurred each day. Throughout the swim period, to ensure all swimming were accounted for, the call of "Buddy Up" required campers to stop their swim and join and raise hands with their designated buddy. During free time an ever present game of soccer ensued with campers joining in on either side throughout the play. Evening included various activities including the popular Capture the Flag. During the 1970s, an Outward Bound Ropes course was added.

The Drews sold the camp in 1981 to Laurie and Eric Scoblionko. Scoblionko was offering eight-week sleepaway camp sessions by 2001, charging slightly above the industry average.

Ephram Caflun became the next Assistant Director of Camp Wekeela, joined by his wife Lori. The Cafluns and their three children first arrived in 1997. Ephram is a 1989 alumnus of SUNY College at Oneonta and Lori is a 1986 alumnus of Brandeis University.

In 2005 the Newmans and Waldmans of Camp Indian Acres for boys and Forest Acres Camp for Girls assumed ownership of Wekeela. In 2008, Ephram and Lori Caflun purchased the camp.

Facilities

Camp Wekeela has twenty-three rustic cabins, all with indoor bathrooms and showers. The following are all cabins used by campers. 
Cherokee
Algonquin/Cayuga
Navajo
Chippewa/Sioux
Mohawk/Arapaho
Tuscarora
Penobscot
Abnaki
Apache
Seqouia
Weyou-Wega
Kiaweh/Pomponosac/Rappahanock/ We-You-Wega
Winnebago
Zuni/Quinippiac
Androscoggin/Wyandot
Kineo/Kokodjo
Ogunquit
Onondaga
The campus also includes a dining hall (for seating up to 400), a performing arts building with an indoor and outdoor stage and a gymnasium, and a new Lodge in 2022. Camp Wekeela has abundant recreational facilities and scenic nature preserves spanning sixty plus acres right next to Little Bear Pond. Some of these recreational facilities include horseback riding, tennis courts, baseball diamonds, soccer fields, basketball courts, hockey rink, lacrosse fields, beach volleyball court, climbing tower, natural rock climbing wall, zip-line, high and low ropes course, environmental sciences building, culinary arts building, gymnastics pavilion, photography studio, dance center, weight room, radio building, creative arts center, and a large waterfront for swimming, water-skiing, sailing, windsurfing, kayaking, fishing, and scuba diving.

Organization

Campers
Wekeela's campus can accommodate approximately 300 campers at any time.

Wekeela's diverse population of campers come from 39 states and 12 foreign countries. The majority come from California, Connecticut, Florida, Illinois, Michigan, Maryland, Massachusetts, New York, New Jersey, Ohio and Pennsylvania. While these areas represent the largest concentrations, campers come from all over the United States as well as Europe, and South America.

Staff
Camp Wekeela has a 2:1 camper to staff ratio. All prospective staff members go through an intense interview process with extensive background checks. Wekeela has department heads, group leaders and counselors that come to camp from the United States, Europe, South Africa, Australia, New Zealand and South America. Many of the staff are former Wekeela campers.

Sessions

Camp Wekeela offers:

Full session: 7-week 

1st Session: 3.5 weeks

2nd Session: 3.5 weeks 

Rookie Session: 2-week session at the start of Second Session.

Activities

Water Sports

Swimming, sailing, water-skiing, wakeboarding, canoeing, kayaking, windsurfing, bumper tubing, water trampolines.

Land Sports

Archery, baseball, basketball, disc golf, flag football, fitness, golf, gymnastics, lacrosse, street hockey, soccer, frisbee, beach volleyball.

Creative/Performing Arts

Painting, drawing, tie-dye, pottery, woodworking, rocketry, photography, jewelry, musical theater, dance, radio, video, electric/acoustic guitars, piano, drums.

Tennis

USTA pro instruction and tournaments.

Outdoor Adventure

High/low ropes, rock wall, climbing tower, trailblazing, campfire cooking, orienteering, rappelling, zip lines.

Culinary Arts

Cooking, Baking, Nutrition, Culture

Environmental Education and Animal Care

Horseback riding

Trips

Camping, day hikes, whitewater rafting, ocean surfing, teen trips to New England, Canada, Arizona, Utah and Nevada

Inter-Camps
Inter-camps are when two camps compete against each other in a specific sport. According to Ephram Caflun, although participants play competitively and certainly like to win, emphasis is placed on participation and sportsmanship.

Traditions

College Weekend
During the first session, Wekeela has an all camp competition known as College Weekend. The camp is split into four teams. The four teams compete and are judged based on sport events, spirit events and sportsmanship.

Color War
During the second session, Wekeela has an all camp competition known as Color War. The camp is split into 2 teams. The two teams compete in various activities including sports, spirit events, silent meals, presentations and sportsmanship. The competition begins when the camp director crosses two hatchets, one green, one white. Immediately after, a ceremony called tap outs begins. Each camper is handed an either green or white bead, indicating what team they are on.

Color War teams of the past decades:

 1982: Green Berets vs. White Lightning
 1983: Green Machine vs. White Knights
 1984: Green Giants vs. White Dynamite
 1985: Green Gators vs. Great White
 1986: Green Marines vs. White Warriors
 1987: Green Demons vs. White Wolves
 1988: Green Dragons vs. White Wizards
 1989: Green Cobras vs. White Stallions
 1990: Green Gladiators vs. White Magic
 1991: Green Wolverines vs. White Wisdom
 1992: Green Eagles vs. White Tigers
 1993: Green Scorpions vs. White Fire
 1994: Green Griffins vs. White Cyclones
 1995: Green Grizzlies vs. White Pirates
 1996: Green Gangsters vs. White Zombies
 1997: Green Gargoyles  vs. White Warlords
 1998: Green Vikings vs. White Elephants Parade
 1999: Green Genies vs. White Buffalo
 2000: Green Phoenix vs. White Angels
 2001: Green Ninjas vs. White Pegasus
 2002: Green Jedi vs. White Funk
 2003: Green Jungle vs. White Wave
 2004: Green Assassin vs. White Storm
 2005: Green Dream vs. White Light
 2006: Green Revolution vs. White Ice
 2007: Green Gorillas vs. White Mustang
 2008: Green Hydra vs. White Poseidon
 2009: Green Monsters vs. White Tribe
 2010: Green Android vs. White Nike
 2011: Green Ghost vs. White Skeleton
 2012: Green Galaxy vs. White Outlaws
 2013: Green Odyssey vs. White Armada
 2014: Green Empire vs. White Pulse
 2015: Green Heroes vs. White Sky
 2016: Green Renaissance vs. Wild White
 2017: Green Future vs. White Eden
 2018: Green Panther vs. White Hive
 2019: Royal Green vs. White Legion
2020: Green Aurora vs. White Eclipse
2021: Green Atlas vs. White Rose

Campfires
Once a week Camp Wekeela has a campfire. Campers and counselors are encouraged to sing songs, tell jokes, read poems and tell stories. Camp fires are special because it is a time for the entire camp to get together as one in a place Wekeela calls the council ring.

Notable people with associations to Camp Wekeela
Willie Garson attended Camp Wekeela for 11 years.
Patrick Dempsey attended Camp Wekeela.
Terry Kirby spent a part of his summers teaching optional programs at Camp Wekeela such as football, strength/fitness and speed training.

Accreditation
Camp Wekeela is an accredited member of the American Camping Association.

References

External links
 Camp Wekeela official website
 Camp Wekeela Interactive Map

Wekeela
Companies based in Oxford County, Maine
Buildings and structures in Oxford County, Maine